Dairis Leksis (born 9 April 1972) is a Latvian luger. He competed at the 1994 Winter Olympics and the 1998 Winter Olympics.

References

External links
 

1972 births
Living people
Latvian male lugers
Olympic lugers of Latvia
Lugers at the 1994 Winter Olympics
Lugers at the 1998 Winter Olympics
People from Valka